Ulysses in Nighttown is a play based on the fifteenth episode of the 1922 novel Ulysses by James Joyce (unique among the book's episodes in that it is written as a play script) that was adapted by Marjorie Barkentin and contains incidental music by Peter Link. The show opened Off-Broadway in 1958 with Zero Mostel to a long and successful run, earning Mostel an Obie Award. It debuted on Broadway on February 15, 1974 at the Winter Garden Theatre and ran for 69 performances. The show had previously done a preview run of 26 performances in Philadelphia. The cast included Zero Mostel, Margery Beddow, Fionnula Flanagan, Gale Garnett, Tommy Lee Jones, and David Ogden Stiers.

The play received six nominations for the 1974 Tony Awards, winning in the category for best lighting design. Zero Mostel was also one of twenty-eight actors to receive special awards from Drama Desk in 1974.

Awards and honors

Original Broadway production

See also
Ulysses, Episode 15 "Circe"

Sources
 

1958 plays
Broadway plays
Off-Broadway plays
Plays based on novels
Ulysses (novel)